Daniel Greaves may refer to:
 Daniel Greaves (musician) (born 1970), Canadian rock vocalist and songwriter
 Dan Greaves (discus thrower) (born 1982), British athlete
 Danny Greaves (footballer) (born 1963), English former professional footballer
 Daniel Greaves, Best Animated Short Film winner in 64th Academy Awards